This article contains records and statistics for the Japanese professional football club, Shimizu S-Pulse.

J.League

Domestic cup competitions

International Competitions

Top scorers by season

References

Shimizu S-Pulse
Shimizu S-Pulse